The 1964 Oakland Raiders season was the team's fifth in both Oakland and the American Football League. The campaign saw the team attempt to improve upon its impressive 10–4 record from 1963. The Raiders' efforts, however, would prove fruitless. The team staggered out to an abysmal 1–7–1 record over its first nine games. While the Raiders pulled themselves together over the final five games of the season (in what amounted to a 4–0–1 run), their slow start ensured that they would miss the postseason for a fifth consecutive year.

During the preseason, the Raiders played the Houston Oilers in Las Vegas at Cashman Field in the first professional football game ever held there. 56 years later, the Raiders would relocate to the Las Vegas metropolitan area and play at the newly-built Allegiant Stadium starting in 2020.

After this season, the Raiders would not finish lower than second place in the AFL/AFC West again until 1979 and would not have another losing season until 1981.

Roster

Season schedule

Standings

Season summary

Week 15 vs Chargers

References 

Oakland
Oakland Raiders seasons
Oakland